John Douglas Morrison  (2 December 1934 – 22 January 2020) was an Australian police officer for the New South Wales Police Force, where he rose to the rank of Chief Inspector, and local government politician who was an alderman, deputy mayor and mayor of the Municipality of Waverley. He was the father of Australian Prime Minister, Scott Morrison.

Early life and career
Morrison was born in Waverley, New South Wales, in 1934, the son of Douglas Charles John Morrison (1900-1977) and Gwendoline Noel Webster (1902-1979). On 18 August 1953, Morrison was called up to undertake National Service as a Private in the Australian Army. On 4 January 1954, at the age of 19, Morrison joined the New South Wales Police Force. He married Marion Elsie Smith (b. 1943) on 16 February 1963 in Sydney.

On 31 March 1983, Sergeant 1st Class Morrison was promoted to the commissioned rank of Inspector in the Police Force.

Political career
Morrison was first elected as an alderman of the Municipality of Waverley in December 1968 as an Independent, being one of the first two policemen in the state elected to such an office, follow a rule change that permitted it in 1964. Morrison only served a single term, leaving the Council in September 1971. He stood for election again in September 1974, and was elected. Morrison spearheaded efforts to limit and manage the levels of development that was occurring in Waverley at the time and was recognised as having saved "many of the free-standing homes in Bronte". Although elected as an Independent alderman, Morrison was associated with the unofficial 'Liberal' coalition. In September 1984, he was elected to serve a single term as deputy mayor under mayor Ray Collins.

On 23 September 1985 he defeated Labor alderman Barbara Armitage to succeed Collins and serve a single term as mayor, with the Sydney Morning Herald noting "Alderman Morrison is known for not participating in the often heated debates which have come to characterise the political conflicts on the council. Accusations of inefficiency, lying and personal insults are regularly traded in council by both the left and right. Alderman Morrison acknowledged the deep rift between the seven-member Liberal coalition majority and the five-member Labor team on council but said he hoped that "decorum would reign"." In January 1986 was promoted to the police rank of Chief inspector commanding the No. 10 Division (Woolahra and Waverley) covering the Eastern suburbs. In response to questions of a conflict of interest between his two roles, Morrison noted: "The Police have always worked in close co-operation with Waverley Council". However his police appointment was appealed by several senior police officers at the Police Appeals Tribunal, which subsequently overturned Morrison's appointment in April 1986. Morrison was later promoted to Chief inspector commanding the No. 15 Division (Maroubra) covering the Eastern and Southeast suburbs.

On his time at Council Morrison recalled: "I was an independent, I wasn’t a party man, I managed to get involved in a few things, I saved Bronte from being overdeveloped with high rises, I stopped a huge development which would have changed the social fabric of the whole area." Morrison retired from the Council in September 1987.

Later life
Morrison continued his service in the Police Force until retirement on 11 May 1992. On 27 August 1993, the NSW Minister for Land and Water Conservation, George Souris, appointed Morrison to serve on the Botany General Cemetery and Eastern Suburbs Crematorium Trust. He was reappointed in 1994 and 1999. Reappointed again in 2004, Morrison was Chairman of the Eastern Suburbs Memorial Park Board from 1 January 2005 to 3 August 2012, and led efforts to create and dedicate a Police Memorial in the Eastern Suburbs Memorial Park. The Police Memorial was officially unveiled by Police Commissioner Andrew Scipione on 30 November 2015.

In January 2001, Morrison was awarded the Centenary Medal for "service to the youth". In the 2004 Queen's Birthday Honours, Morrison was awarded the Medal of the Order of Australia (OAM) for "service to the community of eastern Sydney, particularly through youth, church, amateur theatre and service groups."

Morrison died at his home in Bronte, aged 85 on 22 January 2020.

References

1934 births
2020 deaths
Deputy mayors of places in Australia
Mayors of Waverley, New South Wales
Australian Army soldiers
Australian police officers
Parents of prime ministers of Australia
People from Sydney
Australian people of Scottish descent
Independent politicians in Australia
Recipients of the Centenary Medal
Recipients of the Medal of the Order of Australia